Wellington Jewels was a Washington, D.C.-based jewellery store and direct mail chain, operating from the 1960s through the 1990s. The chain specialized in "artificial" and/or "counterfeit" diamond jewelry and sold high-quality gold and platinum settings containing imitation gems.

Wellington Jewels was a business venture of marketer, socialite and activist Helen Ver Standig(née Von Stondeg), aka "Madame Wellington," and her husband Moishe Belmont "Mac" Ver Standig. Mrs. Ver Standig was the subject of a caricature that New York Times cartoonist Al Hirschfeld drew of her at her husband's request, this caricature was extensively used in the chain's advertising. In its heyday, Wellington Jewels had retail stores in Washington, D.C., Philadelphia, Tysons Corner, Toronto and Palm Beach, among others.

In 1992, the M. Belmont Ver Standig group sold Wellington Jewels to QVC.

References 

American jewellers
Privately held companies based in Washington, D.C.